Bob Lingenfelter (born September 1, 1954) is a former American football tackle and guard. He played for the Cleveland Browns in 1977 and for the Minnesota Vikings in 1978.

References

1954 births
Living people
People from Norfolk, Nebraska
Players of American football from Nebraska
American football offensive tackles
American football offensive guards
Nebraska Cornhuskers football players
Cleveland Browns players
Minnesota Vikings players